Chenopodium spinescens (common names: spiny saltbush, berry saltbush, thorny saltbush, creeping saltbush, hedge saltbush) is a species of plant in the family Amaranthaceae and is endemic to all mainland states and territories of Australia where it is known as Rhagodia spinescens.

Description
The leaves are alternate or opposite, and mealy, looking grey green to almost whitish from their covering of saucer-shaped/spherical hairs. The leaf petiole is about half the length of the lamina. Male and female flowers are usually on different plants. The flowers have five perianth segments that are tiny and all alike, and five stamens. The ripe fruit are red and succulent.

The inflorescence is a panicle or spike, with the flowers' perianth being densely mealy on the outside. The male flowers are globular and 0.5–1 mm in diameter, with their filaments united into a smooth saucer-shaped disc.  The female flowers are larger (about 1 mm) and globular to top-shaped.

In the Northern Territory, it flowers and fruits from February to December, while in Victoria, it flowers from January to April.

Differences from closely related species
The Northern Territory Government website accepts the names R. spinescens (for C. spinescens), R. parabolica (for C. parabolicum) and R. eremaea (for C. eremaea), and describes the differences between them as follows:
Rhagodia spinescens differs from R. parabolica, in having smaller leaves (mostly 5-17 mm long, compared to mostly 15-30 mm long), a narrower inflorescence and a preference for non-rocky sites. It differs from R. eremaea in having leaves that are alternate or opposite (compared to consistently alternate), often spade-shaped, equal length and width or slightly longer than wide (cf. distinctly long relative to their width), with round saucer-like vesicles on the undersurface (compared irregular-shaped vesicles) and have a fishy or foetid odour.

Taxonomy
This saltbush was first formally described in 1810 by Robert Brown who gave it the name Rhagodia spinescens in Prodromus Florae Novae Hollandiae et Insulae Van Diemen. In 2012, Susy Fuentes Bazán and Thomas Borsch moved all species of Rhagodia to Chenopodium within the broader family, Amaranthaceae, a change accepted by Rafaël Govaerts at Plants of the World Online. However, the assignation of this plant to the genus, Rhagodia, and to the family, Chenopodiaceae, is the taxonomy accepted by the Council of Heads of Australasian Herbaria, the National Herbarium of New South Wales, Royal Botanic Gardens Victoria, State Herbarium of South Australia, the Northern Territory Government, Queensland Department of Environment and Science and Western Australian Government Department of Biodiversity, Conservation and Attractions.

Habitat
In the Northern Territory, it occurs on sandplains, alluvial plains, intermittent sandy watercourses, on sandy edges of salt lakes, and rarely on gravelly hillslopes.
In Victoria, it is usually found on  heavy, saline or subsaline soils at the edges of lakes, on flats, and in dune swales.

Distribution
It is found in the IBRA bioregions of Burt Plain, Central Ranges, Channel Country, Coolgardie, Finke, Flinders Lofty Block, Gawler, Great Sandy Desert, Great Victoria Desert, MacDonnell Ranges, Mitchell Grass Downs, Nullarbor, Riverina, Simpson Strzelecki Dunefields, Stony Plains, and Tanami. (Bioregions from Victoria, Queensland and New South Wales may not be included.)

Propagation

References

External links
 Occurrence data for Rhagodia spinescens R.Br. The Australasian Virtual Herbarium. Retrieved 7 July 2018.
 (2017) Rhagodia spinescens. In: Flora of Australia. Australian Biological Resources Study, Department of the Environment and Energy, Canberra.

spinescens
Caryophyllales of Australia
Flora of New South Wales
Flora of South Australia
Flora of Queensland
Flora of Victoria (Australia)
Eudicots of Western Australia
Plants described in 1810